George Costanza (July 4, 1888 – November 27, 1952) was a state representative in Massachusetts serving from 1921 until 1922, representing the Fifth Suffolk District. He served in the state legislature as a Democrat. He served as Health Inspector of Boston for 35 years.

Costanza was born on July 4, 1888 in Boston. He attended Tufts College. He passed away in November 1952, survived by his wife and two daughters.

See also
 1921–1922 Massachusetts legislature

References

1888 births
1952 deaths
Democratic Party members of the Massachusetts House of Representatives
People from Boston